Plagiosiphon gabonensis is a species of plant in the family Fabaceae. It is found in Cameroon and Gabon.

References

Detarioideae
Flora of Gabon
Near threatened plants
Plants described in 1951
Taxonomy articles created by Polbot
Taxa named by Auguste Chevalier